Sue M. Dickenson is a Democratic Party member of the Montana House of Representatives, representing District 25 since 2002.

External links
Montana House of Representatives - Sue Dickenson official MT State Legislature website
Project Vote Smart - Representative Sue Dickenson (MT) profile
Follow the Money - Sue Dickenson
2008 2006 2004 2002 2000 Montana House campaign contributions

Members of the Montana House of Representatives
1945 births
Living people
Politicians from Billings, Montana
Women state legislators in Montana
21st-century American women